Pol-e Karat (also Romanized as Pol-e Karāt; also known as Pol-e Kalāt) is a village in Kelarestaq-e Sharqi Rural District, in the Central District of Chalus County, Mazandaran Province, Iran. At the 2006 census, its population was 44, in 9 families.

References 

Populated places in Chalus County